The Post Man was an English newspaper published between 1695 and 1730. It was edited by Jean de Fonvive, a Huguenot refugee. It appeared three times a week and established such a reputation that the soldier, Duke of Marlborough, insisted that his military dispatches should only appear in its pages.

It was published in London.

References

Newspapers published in London
Publications established in 1695
Publications disestablished in 1730
1690 establishments in England
1730s disestablishments in England